Odostomia elsa is a species of sea snail, a marine gastropod mollusc in the family Pyramidellidae, the pyrams and their allies.

Description
The yellowish white shell is ovate and umbilicated. Its length measures 6.1 mm. The whorls of the protoconch are very small and deeply immersed in the first of the succeeding turns. The six whorls of the teleoconch are well rounded, with strongly concave summits, forming deeply channeled sutures. They are marked by slightly retractive lines of growth, and exceedingly fine, closely placed, wavy spiral striations. The periphery of the body whorl is well rounded. The base of the shell is short, inflated andmoderately umbilicated. The aperture is ovate. The posterior angle is obtuse. The columella is curved, slightly reflected, not reinforced by the base and provided with an oblique fold at some little distance anterior to its insertion. The parietal wall is covered by a thin callus.

Distribution
This species occurs in the Pacific Ocean off Alaska.

References

External links
 To World Register of Marine Species
 To ITIS

elsa
Gastropods described in 1909